This is a list of songs performed by the Australian pop / folk group The Seekers – on record and live in concert, 144 songs in total.

The Seekers
 Judith Durham – lead vocals, tambourine, maracas, piano, celeste, harpsichord, (autoharp - for one song)
 Athol Guy – bass-harmony vocals, acoustic double bass
 Keith Potger – high-harmony vocals, 12- & 6-string acoustic guitars, banjo. Also vocal arrangements for the group.
 Bruce Woodley – mid-harmony vocals, 6-string guitar, mandolin, banjo, (jaw's harp - for one song). Also the main songwriter of the group.

Song list

Notes
Further information about the songs, which were written (or co-written) by Bruce William Woodley, can be found at the following websites:

References

Seekers